Kgetho Malesela Emmanuel 'Madot' Mabokela (born ) is a South African rugby union player for the  in Super Rugby, the  in the Currie Cup and the  in the Rugby Challenge. His regular position is prop.

References

South African rugby union players
Living people
1995 births
People from Polokwane
Rugby union props
Blue Bulls players
Rugby union players from Limpopo
Griquas (rugby union) players